The Rauzdi massacre or Rauza massacre was a war crime perpetrated by the Soviet Army on 30 June 1983 in the village of Rauzdi, in the Ghazni Province, Afghanistan, during the Soviet–Afghan War. According to an Amnesty International report, 24 people were killed. 

According to the Human Rights Watch report, based on eyewitness testimony, 23 of the fatalities were civilians, while one was an armed combatant. The Soviet Army surrounded the village at 2:00 am. The Russian soldiers went from house to house, searching for anti-communist resistance members. They found one, the 18-year old Gholam Hazrat, who hid himself in the well of his garden. Gholam opened fire from the bottom of the well, killing a Russian officer, and wounding a soldier. As a reprisal, the Russian soldiers killed him, and then began shooting everyone in his house, including his father, cousin and two uncles. Afterwards, the Soviet soldiers rounded up several men from the village. The arrested men were beaten, looted, and in the end summarily executed on the streets.

See also
Soviet war crimes
Laghman massacre

References

Bibliograsphy

Soviet war crimes
Crimes against humanity
Soviet–Afghan War
1983 in Afghanistan